Japhe Tejeda is an American singer, songwriter, and producer, best known for co-writing The Boy Is Mine, as well as other various work with Rodney "Darkchild" Jerkins. Tejeda is a former member of the R&B vocal quartet 1 Accord, who were one of the first signees on Shaquille O'Neal's short-lived The World Is Mine (T.W.IsM.) imprint in collaboration with A&M Records.

Songwriting and production credits 
Credits are courtesy of Discogs and AllMusic.

Guest & miscellaneous vocal appearances

Awards and nominations

References 

21st-century American singers
21st-century American male singers
African-American songwriters
American male singer-songwriters
American rhythm and blues singer-songwriters
Living people
Year of birth missing (living people)